The communauté de communes Fercher - Pays florentais is located in the Cher département of the Centre-Val de Loire region of France. It was created on 1 January 2001 and its seat is the town Saint-Florent-sur-Cher. Its area is 232.0 km2, and its population was 11,527 in 2018.

Composition
The communauté de communes consists of the following 9 communes:

Civray
Lunery
Mareuil-sur-Arnon
Plou
Primelles
Saint-Caprais
Saint-Florent-sur-Cher
Saugy
Villeneuve-sur-Cher

References

Fercher - Pays florentais
Fercher - Pays florentais